The Real Audiencia of Santo Domingo was the first court of the Spanish crown in America.  It was created by Ferdinand V of Castile in his decree of 1511, but due to disagreements between the governor of Hispaniola, Diego Colon and the Crown, it was not implemented until it was reestablished by Charles V in his decree of September 14, 1526. This audiencia would become part of the Viceroyalty of New Spain upon the creation of the latter two decades later. Nevertheless, the audiencia president was at the same time governor and captain general of the Captaincy General of Santo Domingo, which granted him broad administrative powers and autonomy over the Spanish possessions of the Caribbean and most of its mainland coasts. This combined with the judicial oversight that the audiencia judges had over the region meant that the Santo Domingo Audiencia was the principal political entity of this region during the colonial period.

Structure
Law II ("That in the City of Santo Domingo in Hispaniola reside the Royal Audiencia and Chancellory, and of its Ministers, District and Jurisdiction") of Title XV ("Of the Royal Audiencias and Chancellories of the Indies") of Book II of the Recopilación de Leyes de las Indias of 1680—which compiles the decrees of September 14, 1526; June 4, 1527; April 19, 1583; October 30, 1591, and February 17, 1620—describes the limits and functions of the Audiencia.

The Audiencia of Santo Domingo maintained judicial oversight of Caracas Province, except for two short periods from 1717 to 1723 and 1739 to 1742, until the establishment of the Audiencia of Caracas in 1786. It also oversaw the provinces of Maracaibo, Margarita, Cumaná (New Andalusia), Guyana, Barinas and Trinidad, (which had been transferred to the Audiencia of Bogotá in 1739) from 1777 to 1786, while plans for the new Real Audiencia of Caracas were finalized. The president of the Audiencia retained administrative oversight of Margarita, Cumaná and Caracas throughout the majority of the colonial period.

Because Spain ceded Hispaniola to France in the Peace of Basel of 1795, the Audiencia was transferred to Santa María del Puerto Príncipe (today Camagüey, Cuba) by the royal decree of March 17, 1799. The new Audiencia was set up the following year and called the Real Audiencia of Puerto Príncipe.  This Audiencia maintained jurisdiction over Cuba, Puerto Rico, Louisiana and Florida. In 1838 the Real Audiencia of Havana was created, with the Puerto Príncipe retaining jurisdiction over the Eastern and Central departments of Cuba, since Spain had lost Florida and Louisiana. In 1831 the Real Audiencia of Puerto Rico was established, but it was dissolved in 1853.

References

See also
Colony of Santo Domingo − Captaincy General of Santo Domingo
Museo de las Casas Reales
Spanish Empire

Spanish West Indies
Santo Domingo
History of the Colony of Santo Domingo
Colonial government in the West Indies
Colonial Puerto Rico
Colonial Venezuela
Spanish colonial period of Cuba
History of the Dominican Republic
History of the Caribbean
History of New Spain
Spanish colonization of the Americas
1511 establishments in the Spanish Empire
1526 establishments in New Spain
1799 disestablishments in New Spain